Numa Numa may refer to:

Numa Numa, Papua New Guinea, a mission on Bougainville Island, Papua New Guinea
Numa Numa Harbour, a harbour near Numa Numa, Papua New Guinea
Numa Numa Trail, a trail on Bougainville in Papua New Guinea that runs from Numa Numa on the east coast over the central mountains of Bougainville to Torokina on the western coast
"Dragostea Din Tei", a song where the expression is heard frequently; an alternative name for the song
Numa Numa (video), an internet meme based on a video by American vlogger Gary Brolsma made after the song "Dragostea Din Tei"

See also
Numa (disambiguation)